The following is a list of members of the NASCAR Hall of Fame. A total of 61 individuals have been inducted into the NASCAR Hall of Fame. 47 were inducted as drivers, 26 of whom were inducted solely as drivers. The other 21 were inducted for their accomplishments as drivers, owners, crew chiefs, and/or broadcasters. 22 were inducted for their roles as owners in the sport. 5 were inducted as promoters of the sport. 5 members were inducted as crew chiefs.

Inductees into the Hall of Fame
References:

Inaugural class (2010)

Class of 2011

Class of 2012

Class of 2013

Class of 2014

Class of 2015

Class of 2016

Class of 2017

Class of 2018

Class of 2019

Class of 2020

Class of 2021
Note: Starting this year, NASCAR only named three inductees into each class of the NASCAR Hall of Fame, with two inductees on a Modern Era ballot and the other inductee on the Pioneer Ballot.

Class of 2022
There was no Class of 2022 as NASCAR decided to postpone the induction ceremony for the Class of 2021 to 2022 due to the COVID-19 pandemic.

Class of 2023

References

NASCAR Hall of Fame members
NASCAR Hall of Fame members
Hall of Fame members
Hall of Fame members
NASCAR